First South Western may refer to:

First South West - bus operator in England
South Western Railway - train operator in England